The Bezirk Bregenz is an administrative district (Bezirk) in Vorarlberg, Austria. It comprises the Bregenz Forest region, the Leiblach valley, and the Austrian part of Lake Constance.

The area of the district is 863.37 km², its population is 130,425 (2012), and the population density is 151 people per km². The administrative centre of the district is Bregenz.

Administrative divisions 
The district is divided into 40 municipalities, one of them is a town, and six are market towns.

Towns 
Bregenz (28,012)

Market towns 
Bezau (1,976)
Egg (3,452)
Hard (12,696)
Hörbranz (6,357)
Lauterach (9,612)
Wolfurt (8,173)

Municipalities 
Alberschwende (3,139)
Andelsbuch (2,356)
Au (1,684)
Bildstein (714)
Bizau (1,015)
Buch (556)
Damüls (324)
Doren (1,024)
Eichenberg (379)
Fußach (3,726)
Gaißau (1,700)
Hittisau (1,852)
Höchst (7,764)
Hohenweiler (1,261)
Kennelbach (1,860)
Krumbach (2,252)
Langen (1,300)
Langenegg (1,066)
Lingenau (1,341)
Lochau (5,490)
Mellau (1,311)
Mittelberg (5,013)
Möggers (517)
Reuthe (611)
Riefensberg (1,024)
Schnepfau (472)
Schoppernau (934)
Schröcken (228)
Schwarzach (3,746)
Schwarzenberg (1,822)
Sibratsgfäll (395)
Sulzberg (1,760)
Warth (1,521)

(population numbers 2012)

Notes and references

 
Districts of Vorarlberg
Lechquellen Mountains